Route 338, or Highway 338, may refer to:

Australia

Canada
Manitoba Provincial Road 338
Prince Edward Island Route 338
 Quebec Route 338

Hungary
 Main road 338 (Hungary)

Japan
 Japan National Route 338

Thailand
Highway 338 (Thailand)

United States
  Georgia State Route 338
  Kentucky Route 338
  Maryland Route 338 (former)
  Nevada State Route 338
  New Mexico State Road 338
 New York:
  New York State Route 338 (disambiguation)
  County Route 338 (Erie County, New York)
  County Route 338 (Saratoga County, New York)
 County Route 338 (Wayne County, New York)
  Ohio State Route 338 (former)
 Ohio State Route 338J (former)
  Pennsylvania Route 338
  Puerto Rico Highway 338
  Tennessee State Route 338
 Texas:
  Texas State Highway 338
  Texas State Highway Loop 338
  Virginia State Route 338
  Wyoming Highway 338